Vincent Angelo LaRusso (born May 16, 1978) is an American actor. He is best known for playing Adam Banks in The Mighty Ducks trilogy.

Early life and education
LaRusso is the youngest son of Anthony Sr. and Joann LaRusso, and grew up in Madison, New Jersey. He has an older brother named Anthony. He graduated from Madison High School in 1996 and earned a Bachelor of Science degree in business administration from Boston University.

Career
LaRusso is best known for having starred as Adam Banks in all three Mighty Ducks films. He was originally slated to play a lesser character, Larson, before being elevated to a bigger role.

He is very active in participating in reunions, meet-and-greets, and events. He was in attendance at the 25th anniversary of the Anaheim Ducks hockey team in February 2019, along with many of the trilogy's co-stars.

LaRusso reprised his role as Adam Banks in an episode of the Disney+ series The Mighty Ducks: Game Changers in which several of the original Mighty Ducks return for a reunion.

Personal life
LaRusso resides in New York City, where he works in the hospitality sector.

Filmography

Film

Television

References

External links

1978 births
American male film actors
American male television actors
American people of Italian descent
Boston University School of Management alumni
Living people
Male actors from New Jersey
People from Livingston, New Jersey
People from Madison, New Jersey
Madison High School (New Jersey) alumni